To My Daughter With Love on the Important Things in Life is a book of poetry written by the American poet of love Susan Polis Schutz, dedicated to her daughter, Jordanna Polis Schutz. The first edition of the book was published in 1986. Stephen Schutz, Susan's husband and Jordanna's father, designed and illustrated it. Currently, the book is at its 2007 edition.

Themes
The book's subjects are the love and life lessons on being a woman that Susan intends to convey to her daughter. Schutz states in the introduction that her motivation to do so was to empower her daughter.

The themes of the poetry include love, womanhood, family, friendship, and optimism. One of the repeated tenets of the poetry is that success and joy in life follows love.

Editions
Susan updated the book as Jordanna grew to adulthood. It is now at its 2007 edition, and has remained popular as new poems were added.

Quotes
From Susan to her daughter (as well as the reader) (1986 edition):

"Love is the most important emotion that you will ever have. I hope that you are able to open yourself up to a beautiful love. I have tried to express what love means to me. You will discover your own meaning. SPS"

"Love is the source of security/Love is the source of life"

References
Schutz, S.P. 1986. To My Daughter With Love on the Important Things in Life, Blue Mountains Press, Boulder, Colorado.

American poetry collections
1986 poetry books